Ideal Department Store Building may refer to:

in the United States
 Ideal Department Store Building (Birmingham, Alabama), listed on the National Register of Historic Places (NRHP) in Birmingham, Alabama
 Ideal Department Store Building (Massillon, Ohio), NRHP-listed in Stark County

See also
Ideal Building, Denver, Colorado, listed on the NRHP in downtown Denver